Diváky is a municipality and village in Břeclav District in the South Moravian Region of the Czech Republic. It has about 500 inhabitants.

History
The first written mention of Diváky is from 1237.

Notable people
Alois Mrštík (1861–1925), writer; lived and worked here
Vilém Mrštík (1863–1912), writer; lived and died here

References

External links

 

Villages in Břeclav District